The Rose That Grew from Concrete is a posthumous album based on the poetry/writings of Tupac Shakur, released on November 21, 2000. This album features a large cast of celebrities reading Shakur's poetry and writing, much in the spirit of a traditional spoken-word album. 2Pac is featured on the song "The Rose That Grew from Concrete". These vocals were remixed onto the track from the song "Mama's Just a Little Girl" that was recorded in 1996 and released in 2002 on the album "Better Dayz".

It sold 262,672 copies in the United States as of 2011.

Track listing

Charts

Personnel 

 Jamal Joseph — Producer
 Tevin Thomas — Co-Producer, Keyboards on "God", " Only 4 the Righteous"
 Mike Mingioni — Engineer, Cover Photo, Liner Notes, Executive Producer, Bass, Vocals on "Wake Me When I'm Free"
 Molly Monjauze — Executive Producer
 Herbert Leonard — Percussion
 Gloria Cox — Executive Producer
 Russell Simmons — Performer
 Atiba Wilson — Flute
 Mos Def - Performer
 Tim Izo Orindgreff — Flute
 Dead Prez - Performer
 Royal Bayyan — Guitar & Keyboards
 Jasmine Guy - Performer
 Sonia Sanchez — Liner Notes
 QD3 - Performer
 Brian Gardner — Mastering
 Danny Glover - Performer
 Taavi Mote — Mixing
 Red Rat — Producer
 Skip Saylor — Mixing
 TuPac — Vocals
 Chris Puram — Mixing
 Nefertiti — Vocals (Background)
 Claudio Cueni — Mixing
 Val Young — Vocals (Background)
 Atiba Wilson — Percussion
 Tom Whalley — A&R
 Sikiru Adepoju — Performer
 Juan Ramirez — Assistant Engineer
 Sarah Jones — Performer
 Malcolm-Jamal Warner — Bass
 Jeffery Newbury — Photography
 Claudio Cueni — Engineer
 Voza Rivers — Producer
 Brian Springer — Engineer
 Royal Bayyan — Producer
 Thomas R. Yezzi — Engineer
 Khalis Bayyan — Saxophone
 Tyson Leeper — Engineer
 Charles Mack — Vocals (Background)
 Duncan Aldrich — Engineer
 Nikki Giovanni — Vocals
 Noelle Scaggs — Liner Notes, Vocals on "If There Be Pain"
 Q-Tip — Performer
 Tre Hardson — Performer
 Erik Rico — Producer

References 

Compilation albums published posthumously
2000 compilation albums
Tupac Shakur compilation albums
Amaru Entertainment albums
Interscope Records albums